Timothy James Jacobs (born March 28, 1952 in Espanola, Ontario and raised in Keswick, Ontario) is a retired professional ice hockey defenceman who briefly played in the National Hockey League for the California Golden Seals.

Career statistics

Regular season and playoffs

External links

1952 births
Living people
California Golden Seals draft picks
California Golden Seals players
Canadian ice hockey defencemen
Ice hockey people from Ontario
People from the Regional Municipality of York
Salt Lake Golden Eagles (CHL) players
Salt Lake Golden Eagles (WHL) players
Springfield Indians players
St. Catharines Black Hawks players